Utica High School may refer to:

Utica High School (Michigan)
Utica High School (Ohio)